Carmelo Patti (c. 1934 – 2016) was an Italian businessman with close links to the Mafia. He was closely associated with Matteo Messina Denaro, a Mafia godfather arrested on January 16, 2023 after 30 years of being in hiding. In 2018, Italian police seized 1.5bn euros of assets from Patti's family on the basis that they related to the proceeds of crime.

References 

1930s births
2016 deaths
Italian businesspeople
People from Castelvetrano